Meade County High School (formerly Brandenburg High School) is a public high school in Brandenburg, Kentucky, United States. It was established in 1914, and is part of the Meade County Schools district.

It serves the county, except for people living on Fort Knox; people living on Fort Knox are instead zoned to the Department of Defense Education Activity (DoDEA), which operates Fort Knox Middle High School.

Notable alumni 
 Chip Jaenichen, former United States Maritime Administrator
 Rick Stansbury, college basketball coach

References

External links 
 

Public high schools in Kentucky
Schools in Meade County, Kentucky
Educational institutions established in 1914
1914 establishments in Kentucky
Brandenburg, Kentucky